Lomé–Tokoin International Airport (French: Aéroport international de Lomé-Tokoin) , also known as Gnassingbé Eyadéma International Airport (French: Aéroport international Gnassingbé Eyadéma), is an international airport serving Lomé, the capital of Togo. In 2014, the airport served 616,800 passengers. ASKY Airlines, a subsidiary of Ethiopian Airlines, has its hub at the airport. The airport is named after Gnassingbé Eyadéma, the third President of Togo.

A new terminal at the airport opened in early 2016, with a capacity for up to 2 million passengers annually.

Airlines and destinations

Statistics

Gallery

References

Airports in Togo
Lomé